"Grow Some Funk of Your Own" is a song by English musician Elton John. It was released as a single in 1976 from the album Rock of the Westies. It shared its A-side status with "I Feel Like a Bullet (In the Gun of Robert Ford)". The song went to No. 14 on the Billboard Hot 100, but in Britain broke a five-year run of successful singles by failing to reach the top 50 despite extensive radio play. Guitarist Davey Johnstone is credited as a co-writer.

Synopsis
The song centers on a man who wakes up after a bad dream entailing an episode set in Mexico, where the protagonist (presumably either John or Taupin) falls for a young lady in a small town but is dismissed by her boyfriend, telling him to return to where he came from (hence the lyric, "Take my advice/take the next flight/and grow your funk/grow your funk at home").

Reception
Cash Box called it "a hard-driving rocker which has a part audiences will sing along to and maybe provide another encore to his live show" with "an absolutely frantic ending with the vibraphones receiving the beating of their lives."  Record World said that "Elton shows why he's on top with his 'English charm' and an enthusiastic no holds barred rock 'n' roll sound."

Personnel
 Ray Cooper – castanets, tambourine, bell tree, vibraphone
 Kiki Dee – backing vocals
 Davey Johnstone – electric guitars, backing vocals
 Elton John – piano, vocals
 Kenny Passarelli – bass, backing vocals
 Roger Pope – drums
 Caleb Quaye – electric guitars, backing vocals

Chart performance

References 

Elton John songs
1975 songs
1976 singles
Songs with music by Elton John
Songs with lyrics by Bernie Taupin
Song recordings produced by Gus Dudgeon
DJM Records singles
MCA Records singles